The 1986 Jordanian  League (known as The Jordanian  League,   was the 36th season of Jordan League since its inception in 1944. Al-Faysali won its  20th title after winning the title play-off match against Al-Wehdat 2-0.

Teams

Map

Overview
Al-Faysali won the championship.

League standings

Al-Faysali won its  20th title after winning the title play-off match against Al-Wehdat 2-0.

References
RSSSF

Jordanian Pro League seasons
Jordan
Jordan
football